This is a list of the first women lawyer(s) and judge(s) in Kentucky. It includes the year in which the women were admitted to practice law (in parentheses). Also included are women who achieved other distinctions such becoming the first in their state to graduate from law school or become a political figure.

Firsts in Kentucky's history

Lawyers 

First female: Sophonisba Breckinridge (1895) 
First African American female: Sallie J. Seals White (1904)   
First African American female prosecutor: Alberta O. Jones (1959)

State judges 

 First female: Kathleen Mulligan in 1928 
 First female (Kentucky Court of Appeals): Judy Moberly West in 1987  
 First African American female: Janice R. Martin (1977) in 1991  
 First female elected (Kentucky Supreme Court): Janet Stumbo in 1993  
 First female to sit (Kentucky Supreme Court): Sara Walter Combs (1979) in 1993 
 First female (Sixth Judicial District): Lisa Ann Payne in 2001  
 First female (Chief Judge; Kentucky Court of Appeals): Sara Walter Combs (1979) from 2004-2010  
 First African American female (Kentucky Court of Appeals): Denise G. Clayton in 2007  
 First female (Forty-Third Judicial Circuit): Traci Peppers in 2014  
 First female (Nineteenth Judicial District Court): Kim Leet Razor in 2018  
 First female (Third Supreme Court District of the Supreme Court of Kentucky): Debra Hembree Lambert in 2019  
 First African American female (circuit court): Denise G. Clayton  
 First Latino American female: Ellie Kerstetter in 2020  
 First openly lesbian female (family court): Shelley Santry in 2022
 First African American (female) (Chief Judge; Kentucky Court of Appeals): Denise G. Clayton in 2023

Federal judges 
First female (Eastern District of Kentucky): Julia Kurtz Tackett 
First female (U.S. District Court for the Eastern District of Kentucky; U.S. District Court for the Western District of Kentucky: Jennifer B. Coffman (1978) in 1993

Assistant Attorney General 

 First female: Blanche Mackey in 1943

Firsts in local history

 Traci Peppers: First female to serve on the Forty-Third Judicial Circuit in Kentucky (Barren and Metcalfe Counties, Kentucky; 2014)
 Kim Leet Razor: First female to serve on the Nineteenth Judicial District Court in Kentucky (2018) [Bracken, Fleming, and Mason Counties, Kentucky]
 Julia Fields: First female to serve as a Judge of the District Court in the Oldham-Trimble-Henry County District, Kentucky (1983)
 Betty Springate (1979): First female lawyer in Anderson County, Kentucky
 Martha Agnes (Gunn) Howle: First female magistrate in Ballard County, Kentucky
 Lynne Pierce Dean: First female to serve as the County Attorney for Boyle County, Kentucky (2017)
 Tina Teegarden: First female judge-executive in Bracken County, Kentucky (2018)
 Rebecca Sue Ward (1986): First female judge in Bullitt County, Kentucky (1999)
 Lisa Ann Payne: First female to serve on the  Sixth Judicial District in Kentucky (2001) [Daviess County, Kentucky]
 Julia Kurtz Tackett: First female Assistant Commonwealth's Attorney in Fayette County, Kentucky (c. 1974)
 Margaret Kannensohn: First female to serve as the County Attorney for Fayette County, Kentucky (c. 1995)
 Cassie J. Patrick Allen: First female member of the Floyd County Bar Association, Kentucky
 Phyllis Sharon Bowles (1985): First female admitted to the Hart County Bar Association in Kentucky
 Denise G. Clayton: First African American female to serve as a circuit judge in Jefferson County, Kentucky
 Shelley Santry: First openly lesbian female to serve as a Judge of the Jefferson Family Court (2022)
 Rebecca Westerfield: First female to serve as President of the Louisville Bar Association [Jefferson County, Kentucky]
 Ruth Long Wells: First female attorney in Johnson County, Kentucky (1928).  Ms. Wells was admitted to the Kentucky Bar in 1928 and was a member of the law firm of Wells & Wells (currently Porter, Banks, Baldwin & Shaw, PLLC) in Paintsville, Kentucky.
 Judy Moberly West: First female to serve on the  Kenton County District Court in Kentucky (1980)
 Durenda Lundy Lawson: First female judge in Knox County, Kentucky (2006)
 Fredora P. Lay: First female to serve as the County Attorney for Laurel County, Kentucky (1969)
 Sue Carol Browning: First female judge in Logan County, Kentucky
 Melissa Fannin Phelps: First female to serve as the County Attorney for Martin County, Kentucky (2018)
 Nancy C. Doty: First female elected as a Judge of the Oldham County Fiscal Court (1981-1988)
 Flora Templeton Stuart (c. 1976): First female lawyer to try a case before a jury in Bowling Green, Kentucky [Warren County, Kentucky]
 Amy Hale Milliken: First female to serve as the County Attorney for Warren County, Kentucky (2004)

See also

 List of first women lawyers and judges in the United States

Other topics of interest

 List of first minority male lawyers and judges in the United States
 List of first minority male lawyers and judges in Kentucky

References

Lawyers, Kentucky, first
Kentucky, first
Women, Kentucky, first
Women, Kentucky, first
Women in Kentucky
Lists of people from Kentucky
Kentucky lawyers